Ford is a town in Taylor County, Wisconsin, United States. The population was 276 at the 2000 census. The unincorporated community of Polley is located in the town.

Geography
According to the United States Census Bureau, the town has a total area of 35.1 square miles (90.8 km2), of which, 32.8 square miles (84.8 km2) of it is land and 2.3 square miles (6.0 km2) of it (6.59%) is water.

Most of the water area is Chequamegon Waters, also known as Miller Dam, a man-made lake in the northeast corner of the town.

History
In mid-summer of 1847 a crew working for the U.S. government surveyed a six-mile square which approximates the current boundaries of Ford. Then in October 1854 another crew marked all the section corners in the township, walking through the woods and swamps, measuring with chain and compass.  When done, the deputy surveyor filed this general description:
This Township contains numerous swamps some of which are of considerable extent they are all unfit for cultivation. The surface is Generally level the low Hemlock lands the soil is 3d rate the uplands 2d. The whole of the Township is covered with Timber and is chiefly composed of Hemlock and Y Birch.  The River Enters the Township Near the NW corner of section 1 and flows in a south westerly course with a swift current and has a good motive power for mills. There is no improvements on this Township. The Hemlock and Swamps Except Alder area covered with moss(?).

In 1933 much of the cut-over east half of Ford was designated part of the Chequamegon National Forest

Demographics
As of the census of 2000, there were 276 people, 96 households, and 81 families residing in the town. The population density was 8.4 people per square mile (3.3/km2). There were 103 housing units at an average density of 3.1 per square mile (1.2/km2). The racial makeup of the town was 99.64% White and 0.36% from other races. Hispanic or Latino of any race were 0.36% of the population.

There were 96 households, out of which 39.6% had children under the age of 18 living with them, 64.6% were married couples living together, 13.5% had a female householder with no husband present, and 14.6% were non-families. 12.5% of all households were made up of individuals, and 7.3% had someone living alone who was 65 years of age or older. The average household size was 2.88 and the average family size was 3.09.

In the town, the population was spread out, with 26.8% under the age of 18, 7.6% from 18 to 24, 29.0% from 25 to 44, 24.3% from 45 to 64, and 12.3% who were 65 years of age or older. The median age was 37 years. For every 100 females, there were 112.3 males. For every 100 females age 18 and over, there were 110.4 males.

The median income for a household in the town was $37,813, and the median income for a family was $38,750. Males had a median income of $26,042 versus $21,042 for females. The per capita income for the town was $15,624. About 14.1% of families and 19.5% of the population were below the poverty line, including 18.1% of those under the age of eighteen and 30.4% of those 65 or over.

References

Towns in Taylor County, Wisconsin
Towns in Wisconsin